Musa Shannon (born 1 August 1975) is a former professional footballer and administrator. He played professionally in the United States, Portugal, and China. Born in the United States, he represented the Liberia national team.

Early and personal life
Shannon was born in the United States, where his Liberian parents were attending Syracuse University. Shannon was raised in the Liberian capital of Monrovia, before returning to the United States as a fifteen-year-old in 1990 following the escalation of the First Liberian Civil War.

Playing career
On 2 February 1997, the Tampa Bay Mutiny selected Shannon in the third round (twenty-eighth overall) of the 1997 MLS College Draft. On 10 August 1997, Shannon went on loan to the Carolina Dynamo. He entered the game with five minutes remaining and scored the game-winning goal. In 2000, he moved to Marítimo in the Portuguese Primeira Liga. In 2002, he moved back to the United States where he signed with the Colorado Rapids. On 15 April 2003, Shannon signed with the Vancouver Whitecaps of the USL A-League. He played two games, then was released.  He finished his professional career with Ningbo Yaoma in the Chinese third division.

After retiring as a professional, Shannon returned to the United States to play in the amateur Cosmopolitan Soccer League for Barnstonworth Rovers.

International career
Shannon also represented Liberia at international level, scoring one goal in 12 appearances between 2000 and 2001.

Administration career
Shannon was named as President of FCAK-Liberia in 2008. In 2010, Shannon was elected to the position of Vice-President of the Liberia Football Association.

References

External links
 

1975 births
Living people
Association football forwards
North Carolina Fusion U23 players
Liberian footballers
Liberia international footballers
Colorado Rapids players
Major League Soccer players
Robert Morris Colonials men's soccer players
Sportspeople from Monrovia
Tampa Bay Mutiny players
Vancouver Whitecaps (1986–2010) players
C.S. Marítimo players
A-League (1995–2004) players
Primeira Liga players
Tampa Bay Mutiny draft picks